Insertion point may refer to:

 Cursor (computers), an indicator for a point where input is inserted into a display device
 Landing zone, a military term used for the landing area of an airborne force
 Unicode character , used to denote an insertion into text